Lake Conococha (possibly from Quechua quñuq, qunuq warm, lukewarm, qucha lake, "warm lake") is a South American lake located in the Andes mountains of northwestern Peru. It is located in the region of Ancash near the junction of the roads going from Callejón de Huaylas to Chiquián.

Geography 

It is located at the headwaters of the Santa River which runs in a northwest direction from the lake. 

According to the Köppen climate classification, the area presents a tundra climate (ET); with a mean annual temperature of 4.7 °C and an average annual rainfall of 543 mm.

The village of Conococha is located on the western shore of the lake, where the roads from Lima and Pativilca to Huaraz and Chiquián meet.

Ecology

Flora 
Aquatic vegetation on the shores is represented by reeds of Scirpus spp. and aquatic herbs like watercress, Elodea potamogeton and Myriophyllum sp. While the surrounding meadows include plants of genera Carex and Calamagrostis.

Fauna 
The lake is home to a frog species (Telmatobius mayoloi) discovered in 1996 and endemic of the Santa River basin.

Environmental issues 
Lake Conococha is undergoing a process of eutrophication (overpopulation of plants and algae due to pollution), being the main reasons: livestock raising, blackwater from the surrounding villages, and disposal of solid waste on the lake shores.

See also 
 Caullaraju

References 

Conococha
Conococha